The Sawai language (also Weda) is a South Halmahera language of the Austronesian language family spoken in the Weda and Gane Timor districts of southern Halmahera, northern Maluku Province, Indonesia. There are approximately 12,000 speakers.

Sounds
Below is a description of the Kobe dialect of Sawai spoken in the villages of Lelilef Woyebulan and Kobe Peplis, as well as from Whistler (1995).

Consonants
Sawai has 15 consonants:

Vowels
Sawai has eight vowels:

Syllable

Sawai has the following syllable structure:

 (C)(C)V(C)

Examples:

References

Bibliography

 Burquest, Donald A.; & Laidig, Wyn D. (Eds.). (1992). Phonological studies in four languages of Maluku. The Summer Institute of Linguistics and the University of Texas at Arlington publications in linguistics (No. 108). Dallas: The Summer Institute of Linguistics, The University of Texas at Arlington, and Pattimura University. .
 Whistler, Ronald. (1992). Phonology of Sawai. In D. A. Burquest & W. D. Laidig (Eds.), Phonological studies in four languages of Maluku (pp. 7–32). Dallas: The Summer Institute of Linguistics, The University of Texas at Arlington, and Pattimura University.
 Whistler, Ronald; & Whistler, Jacqui. (1995). Sawai: Introduction and wordlist. In D. T. Tryon (Ed.), Comparative Austronesian dictionary: An introduction to Austronesian studies (part 1: fascicle 1, pp. 659–65). Trends in linguistics, Documentation (No. 10). Berlin: Mouton de Gruyter.

South Halmahera–West New Guinea languages
Languages of Indonesia
Halmahera